Jorquelleh District is one of twelve districts of Bong County, Liberia.

Districts of Liberia
Bong County